Pubali Bank is the largest private commercial bank in Bangladesh. It has more branches than any other private bank in the country. Monzurur Rahman is the present chairman of the bank.

History 
Pubali Bank was started in East Pakistan as Eastern Mercantile Bank Limited in the year 1959 under Bank Companies Act 1913 by Bengali businessmen. After independence of Bangladesh in 1971 this Bank was nationalized under Bangladesh Bank's (nationalisation) Ordinance and renamed as Pubali Bank.

Subsequently, Pubali Bank was denationalized in the year 1983 as a private bank and renamed as Pubali Bank Limited.

The Bank signed a 100 million taka loan agreement with Uttara Finance and Investments Limited in 2007.

In 2009, Pubali Bank had reserves worth 88.89 billion taka. It's non-performing loans went from 18.4 per cent in 2004 to 2.96 per cent.

In February 2014, Bangladesh High Court Division remove eight members of the board of directors including chairman Hafiz Ahmed Mazumder for not possessing the minimum required shares in response to a petition filed by Shafee Ahmed Chowdhury, a shareholder of the bank.

Five million taka went missing in the bank's branch in Chittagong in 2016 following which five employees of the bank were arrested. Three employees of the bank in Chittagong were sent to jail for embezzling 128.6 million taka from the bank. In January, Safiul Alam Khan Chowdhury was appointed managing director of Pubali Bank. In May, Habibur Rahman was appointed chairman of the bank. That's It Fashions Limited, a subsidiary of Ha-Meem Group, announced plans to purchase 11 million shares of Pubali Bank.

In May 2019, Azizul Huq was elected chairman of the Pubali Bank.

In 2021, Bangladesh Securities and Exchange Commission approved 5 billion taka perpetual bonds of the bank. It signed a 52 million USD loan agreement with Bank Muscat.

The Pubali Bank donated one million taka to Bishwo Shahitto Kendro in October 2022. It received 50 million USD from the British International Investment.

Board of directors

References

External links
 Website
 Pubali Bank Limited

Banks of Bangladesh
Banks of Bangladesh with Islamic banking services
Banks established in 1959